Harold Park is a place in the London Borough of Havering.

History
Harold Park is north-eastern part of Harold Wood, occupying an isthmus of land between the A12 and the Ingrebourne River (The River Ingrebourne at Harold Park and Hornchurch).

In 1868 a wealthy Brentwood solicitor built himself a mansion to the south of the river and railway line, named Harold Court. After the owner's bankruptcy the house served as a children's home, then a lunatic asylum and then a sanatorium. In 1959 it became a teacher training college and has now been converted into private flats.
 
Horse Block Farm lay to the north-east of Harold Court Road. After the First World War the Essex builders Iles and Company laid out a bungalow estate here that it called Sunnytown. The company also created Sunnymede at Billericay.
 
When Harold Court primary school opened in 1929 the area still retained a rural character, but this was slowly eroded as further development plugged the gaps, including some industry beside the Ingrebourne River.

Local government
Harold Park was located in the northeastern protrusion of the Hornchurch civil parish. It was part of Romford Rural District until 1926 and was then formed part of Hornchurch Urban District.

Harold Park sits in the Parliamentary Constituency of Hornchurch and Upminster.

Urban development
Maylands Golf club, Harold Park was founded in 1937

Geography
Harold Park sits on the London/Essex border. The boundary goes down the Weald Brook. This has since changed to go down the M25 to junction 11 and then turn west along the A12 to Putwell Bridge where it joins the Ingrebourne. The River Ingrebourne and the Weald Brook meet in the area of Putwell Bridge. The Ingrebourne then flows south west.

Nearest places
 Harold Wood
 Harold Hill
 Brentwood
 Emerson Park
 Romford
 Gidea Park
 Hornchurch
 Upminster
 Shenfield

Transport

Nearest stations
 Harold Wood railway station
 Brentwood railway station
 Gidea Park railway station
 Emerson Park railway station
 Shenfield railway station
 Upminster station

References

Areas of London
Districts of the London Borough of Havering